Raymond Victor Brain (21 November 1952 – 28 September 2019) was an Australian rules footballer, who played for the Fitzroy Football Club in the Victorian Football League (VFL).

References

External links

Fitzroy Football Club players
Australian rules footballers from Victoria (Australia)
1952 births

2019 deaths